The Coupe de France Final 1993 was a football match held at Parc des Princes, Paris on 13 June 1993 that saw Paris SG defeat FC Nantes Atlantique 3-0 thanks to goals by Antoine Kombouaré, David Ginola and Alain Roche. FC Nantes finished the match with 8 players following three red cards.

Match details

See also
Coupe de France 1992-93

External links
Coupe de France results at Rec.Sport.Soccer Statistics Foundation
Report on French federation site
 Summary of the match

Coupe
1993
Coupe De France Final 1993
Coupe De France Final 1993
Coupe de France Final
Coupe de France Final